Christchurch North is a former New Zealand parliamentary electorate. The electorate comprised the northern half of what is now considered the Christchurch Central City.

Population centres
The previous electoral redistribution was undertaken in 1875 for the 1875–1876 election. In the six years since, New Zealand's European population had increased by 65%. In the 1881 electoral redistribution, the House of Representatives increased the number of European representatives to 91 (up from 84 since the 1875–76 election). The number of Māori electorates was held at four. The House further decided that electorates should not have more than one representative, which led to 35 new electorates being formed, including Christchurch North, and two electorates that had previously been abolished to be recreated. This necessitated a major disruption to existing boundaries.

The boundaries of the Christchurch North electorate were Bealey Avenue in the north (then called North Town Belt), Fitzgerald Avenue in the east (then called East Town Belt), Worcester Street in the south (through Latimer and Cathedral Squares), and Park Terrace in the west (then called Antigua Street). The electorate thus comprised the northern half of what is now considered the central city. The civic offices in Worcester Street were used as the polling station for the 1881 election, and George Leslie Lee acted as the returning officer.

The 1981 census had shown that the North Island had experienced further population growth, and three additional general seats were created through the 1983 electoral redistribution, bringing the total number of electorates to 95. The South Island had, for the first time, experienced a population loss, but its number of general electorates was fixed at 25 since the 1967 electoral redistribution. More of the South Island population was moving to Christchurch, and two electorates were abolished, while two electorates were recreated (including Christchurch North). In the North Island, six electorates were newly created, three electorates were recreated, and six electorates were abolished.

History
The electorate existed three times:
1881 to 1890;
1905 to 1946;
1984 to 1996, replacing the Papanui electorate, and then replaced  by the Waimakiriri electorate for MMP.

It was held by three Premiers or Prime Ministers, Julius Vogel (1884 to 1889), Sidney Holland and Mike Moore.

Vogel returned to England in 1888, never to return to New Zealand, and his resignation became effective in early 1889. Edward Wingfield Humphreys won the resulting 1889 by-election and served until the end of the parliamentary term in the following year.

For the  election, a number of Christchurch electorates were amalgamated to form the three-member  electorate. Humphreys came fifth in that election and was thus unsuccessful.

Members of Parliament
The electorate was represented by nine members of parliament.

Key

Election results

1993 election

1990 election

1987 election

1984 election

1943 election

 
 
 
 
 
 
 

 

Table footnotes:

1931 election

1928 election

1914 election

1911 by-election

1889 by-election

1884 election

Notes

References

1881 establishments in New Zealand
1996 disestablishments in New Zealand
Historical electorates of New Zealand
Politics of Christchurch
History of Christchurch
1905 establishments in New Zealand
1984 establishments in New Zealand
1890 disestablishments in New Zealand
1946 disestablishments in New Zealand